The Superior Court of California, County of Merced, also known as the Merced County Superior Court or  Merced Superior Court, is the branch of the California superior court with jurisdiction over Merced County.

History
Merced County was partitioned from Mariposa County in 1855.

In May 1855, John W. Fitzhugh was elected the first County Judge. Judge Fitzhugh presided over the first session, held in June 1855, with associate justices Samuel H.P. Ross and J.A. Vance. Early court history recounts the Court Clerk being beset by winds; when the strong breezes scattered the papers he carried in his hat and pockets, the court would temporarily adjourn in favor of "hunting and catching papers."

The county seat were moved to Snelling via the election of September 1855, and court was held temporarily in the parlor of the only hotel in town. This 1857 courthouse was named California Historical Landmark No. 409 in November 1948.

After the railroad had completed its line to Merced, a petition was filed in October 1872 to move the county seat there, contested by an election held on December 12 of that year. Merced finished first by a clear majority, with Livingston second and Snelling third. The court was moved again, temporarily, to a brick building owned by Olcise & Garibaldi at Front and L streets, then to the lower story of Washington Hall while a second permanent courthouse was being built.

The cornerstone for the new courthouse was laid on July 7, 1874 and the Merced County Courthouse was dedicated on May 8, 1875. It was designed by A. A. Bennett. A close twin was completed in Fresno also in 1875, but it was drastically altered in 1893 and later demolished.

Court operations outgrew the 1875 building and were moved to new facilities in 1950. The one-story 1950 courthouse was designed by Walter Wagner.

Venues

Court operations were consolidated into a single tilt-up concrete building completed in 2007 to a design by Nacht & Lewis. The 1875 courthouse continues to serve the public as the home of the Merced County Courthouse Museum, operated by the Merced County Historical Society; it was rebuilt in 1975 and reopened as a museum in 1983.

In addition to the old and new courthouse locations in Merced, traffic court is held approximately two blocks away in Merced, and a branch court operates in Los Banos. Juvenile justice operations are also held in unincorporated Los Banos.

References

External links
 
 

Superior Court
Superior courts in California